Tania Nolan (born 19 August 1983) is an actress from Rakaia, Canterbury, New Zealand. She is best known for her roles as Isobel Jones in the New Zealand television series The Hothouse (2007) and Angelina Caulfield in the comedy/drama series Go Girls (2009).

Early life
Nolan was born in Rakaia where she lived until age eight, and then moved to nearby Barrhill for the next two years. She is of Irish descent.

Career
Nolan graduated from Toi Whakaari Drama School in 2005 with a Bachelor in Performing Arts (Acting).

She appeared in The Hothouse as Isobel Jones, a role that earned her a nomination for Best Actress at the 2007 NZ Qantas Television Awards. Nolan had a recurring role in Go Girls as Angelina Caulfield. She has starred in the feature film Kissy Kissy (NZ International Film Festival 2007), with an international debut in Underworld: Rise of the Lycans (2009); Nolan also had a supporting role in the Starz series Spartacus: Blood and Sand.

In 2017, Nolan joined the cast of Home and Away as Scarlett Snow. She made her first appearance on 8 May 2017. She departed the show at the conclusion of her character's storyline.

Filmography

Film

Television
{| class="wikitable sortable"
|-
! Year
! Title
! Role
! class="unsortable" | Notes
|-
|2007
|
|Isobel Jones
|TV series
|-
|2008–2009
|Legend of the Seeker
|Dennee Amnell
|Episodes: "Prophecy", "Sacrifice"
|-
|2009
|
|Karyn
|Episode: "The Other Woman"
|-
|2009–2011
|Go Girls
|Angelina Caulfield
|Recurring role (series 1–3)
|-
|2010
|Spartacus: Blood and Sand
|Caecilia
|Episodes: "Mark of the Brotherhood", "Party Favors", "Kill Them All"
|-
|2010
|This Is Not My Life
|Natasha Collins
|Main role
|-
|2012
|Fight Night Legacy
|Nat
|Episodes: "Sweet Science", "The Offer"
|-
|2014–2015
|Step Dave
|Julia Deering
|Main role
|-
|2015
|Grayson: Earth One
|Emma Walker
|Episode: "The Boy and the Bullet"
|-
|2017
|Home and Away
|Scarlett Snow
|Regular role
|-
|2019
|NCIS
|Nena Easterling
|Episode: "Mona Lisa"
|-
|2022
|My Life is Murder (TV series NZ)
|Gilda
|Series 3 Episode 9
|-
|}

Awards
Nominated for Best Actress in the 2007 Qantas Television Awards for her role in The Hothouse''.

References

External links

Living people
1983 births
New Zealand actresses
New Zealand television actresses
Toi Whakaari alumni
People from Rakaia